Arlette Franco (1 October 1939, in Perpignan – 31 March 2010, in Canet-en-Roussillon) was a member of the National Assembly of France.  She represented the Pyrénées-Orientales department,  and was a member of the Union for a Popular Movement. She was also a vice-president of the French Swimming Federation.

References

1939 births
2010 deaths
Union for a Popular Movement politicians
Swimming in France
Women members of the National Assembly (France)
Deputies of the 12th National Assembly of the French Fifth Republic
Deputies of the 13th National Assembly of the French Fifth Republic
21st-century French women politicians
People from Perpignan
Politicians from Occitania (administrative region)
French people of Spanish descent